Fatoş Üstek, born 1980 in Ankara, is a London-based independent Turkish curator and writer, working internationally with large scale organizations, biennials and festivals, as well as commissioning in the public realm. In 2008 she received her MA in Contemporary Art Theory from Goldsmiths College London, after completing her BA in Mathematics at Bogazici University in Istanbul.

Work 
In 2014, Üstek acted as Associate Curator for the 10th Gwangju Biennale in South Korea. subsequently, she curated the fig-2 project, hosted by the Institute of Contemporary Art ICA in London in 2015. The series of 50 week-long exhibitions showed works by artists Laura Eldret, Charles Avery, Rebecca Birch, Annika Ström, Beth Collar, Allison Katz, Tom McCarthy, Shezad Dawood, Suzanne Treister, Lynn Marsh, Jacopo Miliani, Kathryn Elkin, Marjolijn Dijkman, Ben Judd, Karen Mirza, Oreet Ashery, Eva Grubinger, Melanie Manchot, Bruce McLean, Vesna Petresin, Young In Hong, and duo Wright and Vandame, among others.

Üstek was in charge the Akbank 40th Contemporary Artists Prize Exhibition in Istanbul 2022. The same year, she curated Cascading Principles: Expansions within Geometry, Philosophy, and Interference at Oxford Mathematics, one of the largest exhibitions by the artist Conrad Shawcross in the UK. It is accompanied by a four-part symposium in partnership with Modern Art Oxford and Ruskin School of Art.

Üstek sits on selection and award committees for the Scottish and Dutch Pavilions at Venice Biennial and was a judge on Turner Prize 2020. Early 2022, Üstek was appointed as Chair of Trustees of New Contemporaries.

Together with artists Anne Hardy and Lindsay Seers, Fatoş Üstek is co-founder of FRANK, an alliance for fair artists’ pay. She is also a founding member of The Association of Women in the Arts AWITA, a non-profit networking group that aims to advance the careers of women in the visual arts.

Fatos Üstek was named as Curator of Frieze Sculpture 2023, a major annual public art exhibition that places monumental works by leading artists throughout London’s Regent’s Park.

Recognition 
Fatoş Üstek was listed among the 100 most important people in the art world in the Artlyst Power 100 list in 2021, 2019, 2018, and 2017.

References

External links 
 

Turkish academics
Turkish art curators
British art curators
Art writers
British academics
Goldsmiths, University of London
Living people
Art directors
1980 births
British women curators
Turner Prize
British women writers